Shinji Takashima (Japanese: 高島信二, Takashima Shinji; born October 23, 1960 in Yokohama, Kanagawa Prefecture, Japan) is a Japanese musician, composer, and music producer. He is known for being the guitarist of Omega Tribe. Takashima was the only member of Omega Tribe who was in all versions of the band, excluding Brand New Omega Tribe.

Biography 
Takashima formed Kyutipanchosu with fellow guitarist Kenji Yoshida, with vocalist Kiyotaka Sugiyama and keyboardist Akira Senju joining later. The band focused on rock-oriented genres similar to The Doobie Brothers. Takashima participated in the 19th Yamaha Popular Song Contest in 1980 with the band. After winning the contest and Sugiyama being scouted by producer Koichi Fujita, the band renamed themselves as "Kiyotaka Sugiyama & Omega Tribe." The band debuted in 1983 with "Summer Suspicion." During the Kiyotaka Sugiyama & Omega Tribe era, Tetsuji Hayashi was appointed as in charge of the band's songwriting. The group aimed to have a "Japanese pop" sound with influences from black contemporary, jazz fusion and soft rock. The band became popular with multiple hits on the Oricon charts.

Because of conflict between the members and the production team, Kiyotaka Sugiyama & Omega Tribe dissolved in 1985 after their final album First Finale. After Fujita scouted vocalist Carlos Toshiki and guitarist Mitsuya Kurokawa, he and keyboardist Toshitsugu Nishihara formed 1986 Omega Tribe. After Kurokawa left the band for health-related reasons and the band was left as a trio and changed the name to "Carlos Toshiki & Omega Tribe."

After the band's dissolution, he and Nishihara made the offshoot band "DOME" with Satoshi Mikami, Seiichi Sakauchi, and Michihisa Ikeda, releasing one single and one album before dissolving. Takashima then created "Weather Side" with Nishihara and Hideaki Takatori, releasing three albums and three singles before dissolving. He became a producer and director at Being Inc. during the DOME era and into the Weather Side era, but after the dissolution of Weather Side, music production became his center of activity. He was in charge of Bon-Bon Blanco, Aya Kamiki, Wands, and Naifu and a producer of Tube and Mai Kuraki.

Personal life 
Takashima got married in 1988 and is a father of two children.

Compositions

Kiyotaka Sugiyama & Omega Tribe 
"Farewell Call" (March 6, 1985)
"The End Of The River" (July 1, 1985)
"Yunagi Tsushin" (December 11, 1985)

1986 Omega Tribe 
"Blue Reef" (July 23, 1986)
"Older Girl" (July 23, 1986)
"Lady Free" (February 4, 1987)
"Sand On The Seat" (November 18, 1987)

Carlos Toshiki & Omega Tribe 
"Shitsuren Suru Tame no 500 no Manyuaru" (February 8, 1989)
"1000 Love Songs" (November 18, 1987)
"Hemingū~ei ni Aeru Umi" (September 21, 1989)
"Gurei no Nagisa" (September 21, 1989)
"Tsūauto Furubēsu" (June 25, 1990)
"Winner" (July 25, 1990)

DOME 
"Megami-tachi ni Aeru hi" (May 1, 1992)
"Megami-tachi ni Aeru hi (Album version)" (May 21, 1992)
"Live in a Dream" (May 21, 1992)
"Aoi Tsuki no Temptation" (May 21, 1992)
"For You" (May 21, 1992)
"8 Tsuki no Koi" (May 21, 1992)

Weather Side 
"Kaze o Daite" (April 21, 1994)
"Still I Love You" (April 21, 1994)
"Sunao ni Naritakute" (May 20, 1994)
"Balance of Love" (May 20, 1994)
"Ī no sa, Kimi no Mama" (September 21, 1994)
"Sekai yo Futari no Tame ni Mawa re" (September 21, 1994)
"Omoide e Tsudzuku Michi" (October 21, 1994)
"Winter Paradise" (October 21, 1994)
"Natsudakara" (May 19, 1995)
"Ano Natsu o Sagashite" (June 21, 1995)
"U~Edinguberu ga Kikoetara" (June 21, 1995)

Masanori Ikeda 
"Quarterback" (October 21, 1987)

Leo Ku 
"Wǒ de tiānkōng shì chēng de tiānkōng" (November 18, 1995)

Mai Kuraki 
Fuse of Love (August 24, 2005)

Aya Kamiki 
Ashita no Tame ni ~Forever More~ (October 10, 2007)

References 

1960 births
Living people
Japanese guitarists
Omega Tribe (Japanese band) members
Musicians from Yokohama